When You're Smiling is Regis Philbin's second studio album, his first in more than 30 years. In his own words, "When I grew up, it was the age of the great crooners. So, as a New York City kid, I wanted to be a singer. When I was 5, I knew every song Bing Crosby sang."

Track listing

Musicians
Regis Philbin: Vocals
Allan Schwartzberg: Drums
Kenny Ascher: Keyboards
Bob Mann: Guitar
Charles "Chip" Jackson: Bass (tracks 1, 2, 4, 11)
Ed Howard: Bass (tracks 3, 5, 8, 9, 10)
David Finck: Bass (tracks 6, 7)
Warren Vaché: Trumpet solos (tracks 1, 3, 5)
Warren Luening: Trumpet solos (tracks 7, 8, 11)
Robert Sheppard: Saxophone solos (tracks 4, 10)
Background vocals: Dorian Holley, Mortinette Jenkins, Marlena Jeter, Steve Tyrell

All track information and credits were taken from the CD liner notes.

References

External links
Hollywood Records Official Site

2004 albums
Hollywood Records albums